Yermolayevka is a rural locality (a village) in Chuvash-Karamalinsky Selsoviet, Aurgazinsky District, Bashkortostan, Russia. The population was 3 as of 2010. There is 1 street.

Geography 
Yermolayevka is located 27 km southeast of Tolbazy (the district's administrative centre) by road. Novochelatkanovo is the nearest rural locality.

References 

Rural localities in Aurgazinsky District